is a private junior college attached to Asahikawa University in Asahikawa, Hokkaidō, Japan. It was established in 1964 as a women's college, and became coeducational in 2011.

Departments
 Department of Home Economics
 Department of Childcare

See also 
 List of junior colleges in Japan

External links
  

Japanese junior colleges
Universities and colleges in Hokkaido